Pinsa or PINSA may refer to:

 Pensa, Burkina Faso
 Pinsa or pinza, a type of pizza
 Proceedings of the Indian National Science Academy (PINSA)
 Pinsa (bread), a Roman flatbread